SLNS Ranaviru  (Ranaviru, in Sinhalese: Warrior) was a Shanghai-class fast gun boat of the Sri Lanka Navy, attached to the 3rd Fast Gun Boats Squadron. 

On 19 July 1996, SLNS Ranaviru under the command of Lieutenant Commander Parakrama Samaraweera, RSP, was dispatch to the seas off the coast of Mullaitivu where the Sri Lanka Army base was under siege during the first battle of Mullaitivu. She lead the naval force that included Ranaviru, six Dvora Fast Attack Crafts and the landing ship SLNS Shakthi, tasked with attempting an amphibious landing of a relief force to break the siege. Ranaviru was tasked with providing naval gun fire to cover the landing. Due to stiff resistance by costal and sea units of the LTTE, the landing attempt was abandon and landing ships began to withdraw. Ranaviru began covering the withdrawal when it was hit by a Sea Tiger suicide craft which inflected serious damage and disabed its propulsion. Lieutenant Commander Samaraweera and the crew continued firing her guns and small arms until the disabled ship was hit by a second suicide craft resulting in an massive explosion that sank her. Of the crew of 36 only two survived to be rescued by navy crafts. Seven bodies were recovered amides the sea battle. Commander Samaraweera, who was last seen on the bridge firing a rifle was listed missing, his body was never recovered, was posthumously awarded the Weera Wickrama Vibhushanaya for his gallantry and promoted to the rank of Commander.

See also
Bombing of SLNS Sooraya and SLNS Ranasuru
USS Cole bombing
Battle of Mullaitivu (1997)

References

External links
Sri Lanka Navy

Ships of the Sri Lanka Navy
1983 ships
Suicide bombings in Sri Lanka
Ships built in Colombo
Shipwrecks in the Indian Ocean
Maritime incidents in 1994
Liberation Tigers of Tamil Eelam attacks against ships